William Casey Blake (born August 23, 1973) is an American former professional baseball third baseman. He played in Major League Baseball (MLB) for the Toronto Blue Jays, Minnesota Twins, Baltimore Orioles, Cleveland Indians, and Los Angeles Dodgers. He had alternated between playing at third base and first base before becoming a full-time third baseman with the Indians. In , Blake moved to right field to accommodate the Indians' signing of third baseman Aaron Boone, and stayed there for two seasons before moving back to third base.

High school and college
Blake was a four-sport standout at Indianola High School in Indianola, Iowa, where he played baseball, football, basketball, and participated in track. He was named one of the top ten high school athletes in the history of Iowa.

Blake attended Wichita State University, where he was a three-time All-American, two-time Academic All-American and participated in the College World Series. He batted .320 with 22 home runs and 101 RBIs during his senior year. In 1993, he played collegiate summer baseball with the Hyannis Mets of the Cape Cod Baseball League.

Professional career

Toronto Blue Jays
From –, Blake spent most of his time in the minor leagues.  In the Blue Jays minor league system he played for the Hagerstown Suns (1996), Dunedin Blue Jays (1997–98), Knoxville Smokies (1998), St. Catharines Stompers (1999) and Syracuse SkyChiefs (1999–2000). He made his MLB debut on August 14, 1999, against the Oakland Athletics at third base and went 0 for 3 at the plate. He recorded his first hit on August 29 against the Texas Rangers, and his first home run on October 2 against the Cleveland Indians (off pitcher Jim Brower).

Minnesota Twins
The Minnesota Twins claimed Blake off waivers from the Blue Jays in 2000 and played him primarily at AAA with the Salt Lake Buzz (2000) and Edmonton Trappers (2001–02). He appeared in 7 games with the Twins in 2000 and 13 with them in 2001.

Baltimore Orioles
Blake was claimed off waivers by the Baltimore Orioles on September 21, 2001. Blake appeared in only six games with the Orioles at the end of the 2001 season before they released him.

Minnesota Twins
He was picked up again by the Twins in 2002 and played in 9 games for them and 126 with Edmonton that year.

Cleveland Indians

In , Blake became the Indians' everyday third baseman in his first full season in the major leagues. He led the team in games played with 152, hits (143), and doubles (35) while compiling career highs in every offensive category. Blake started in every spot in the batting order except the leadoff spot, the most common slot being the #2 hole in the lineup. He had a fielding percentage of .952. He was named AL Player of the Week of June 30– July 6. He ended the season with 17 home runs, 67 RBIs, and a .257 batting average in 152 games played.

In , Blake had his finest offensive season to date in his second straight full season in the major leagues as the Indians third baseman. In June, he hit .330 (37-112) with seven home runs and 21 RBI in 28 games. From June 1 through the end the season, he hit .283, with 22 home runs and 68 RBIs in 112 games. He had an AL-low fielding percentage of .939 at third base and led the majors at that position with 26 errors. Blake signed a two-year contract on January 21, 2004. He finished the season with a .271 batting average, 28 home runs, and 88 RBIs.

In 2005, Blake converted to right field and filled in at third base and first base. He had 56 extra base hits. Blake made 132 starts in right field, six at third base and four starts at first. In the outfield, he made eight errors in 298 total chances. In 2005, Blake ended the season with a .241 average, 23 home runs, and 58 RBIs, with 116 K's while batting .084 with runners in scoring position.

In , Blake once again was the Indians' starting right fielder. He ultimately ended up missing much of the season due to injury, playing in only 109 games. Blake ended the season with a career-high .282 batting average, 19 home runs, and 68 RBIs.

Andy Marte's demotion to Triple-A resulted in Blake taking over once again as the Indians' starting third baseman. Blake had a 26-game hit streak from May 20 through June 18 during which he hit .317 with seven home runs.

On July 3, Blake hit a solo home run in the top of the 11th against the Detroit Tigers, which gave Cleveland a three-game lead over Detroit.

As the Indians drove for a playoff spot, Blake hit a walk-off home run against the Kansas City Royals on September 14, 2007. Three days later (again facing the Tigers), Blake hit another walk-off home run, all but ending the Tigers' Central Division title hopes.

Blake was twice named clutch player of the year in his time with the Indians.

Los Angeles Dodgers

On July 26, Blake was traded from the Indians to the Los Angeles Dodgers for minor league players Carlos Santana and Jon Meloan. He went 2 for 3 with a double and a run scored in his debut with the Dodgers on July 26. He hit his first home run with the Dodgers on August 2, 2008. Blake hit .251 with 10 home runs in 58 games with the Dodgers in 2008 and on December 9, signed a three-year extension with the club for $17 million.

In 2009, he hit .280 with 18 home runs for the Dodgers and his fielding percentage was the best all-time for a Dodger third baseman.

In 2010, he hit .248, his lowest average since 2005, with 17 home runs and 64 RBI.

Due to various injuries, Blake was only able to appear in 63 games for the Dodgers in 2011, hitting .252 with only 4 home runs, his lowest total since 2002. On September 1, he decided to undergo season-ending surgery on his neck to relieve the pain from a pinched nerve that had bothered him all season.

On October 4, 2011, the Dodgers declined Blake's 2012 option, instead paying him a buyout of $1.25 million and making him a free agent.

Colorado Rockies
On December 20, 2011, Blake signed with the Colorado Rockies. However, he was released before the end of Spring Training on March 27, 2012. Blake announced his retirement on May 8, 2012.

Personal life
Blake splits time between Indianola, Iowa and Los Angeles, California with his wife, four daughters and a son. When asked about his beard, he answers that he grows it simply because he does not like to shave.  The beard also helps camouflage him while participating in one of his favorite hobbies, duck hunting. Blake and his wife began a foundation which donated well over $1,000,000 to the Indianola school district to build the district's athletic, academic and fine arts programs.

References

External links

, or Retrosheet, or Pelota Binaria (Venezuelan Winter League)

1973 births
Living people
Akron Aeros players
Albuquerque Isotopes players
American expatriate baseball players in Canada
Baseball players from Des Moines, Iowa
Baltimore Orioles players
Cardenales de Lara players
American expatriate baseball players in Venezuela
Cleveland Indians players
Dunedin Blue Jays players
Edmonton Trappers players
Hagerstown Suns players
Hyannis Harbor Hawks players
Knoxville Smokies players
Lake County Captains players
Los Angeles Dodgers players
Major League Baseball first basemen
Major League Baseball right fielders
Major League Baseball third basemen
Minnesota Twins players
People from Indianola, Iowa
Rancho Cucamonga Quakes players
Salt Lake Buzz players
St. Catharines Stompers players
Syracuse SkyChiefs players
Toronto Blue Jays players
Wichita State Shockers baseball players